Isaiah Robert-Johan Wong (born January 28, 2001) is an American college basketball player for the Miami Hurricanes of the Atlantic Coast Conference (ACC).

High school career
Raised in South Brunswick, New Jersey, Wong played prep basketball at Notre Dame High School in Lawrenceville, New Jersey during his first two years. 

For his junior season, he transferred to Bonner & Prendergast Catholic High School in Drexel Hill, Pennsylvania. As a junior, he averaged 22.2 points, 6.5 rebounds and 3.6 assists per game, leading his team to the Philadelphia Catholic League regular season title, and was named Catholic League MVP. 

In his senior season, Wong averaged 21.9 points, 7.5 rebounds and 2.5 assists per game. He led his team to the Class 4A state title game and repeated as Catholic League MVP. He committed to playing college basketball for Miami (Florida) over offers from Villanova, UConn, Clemson and Pittsburgh.

College career
On February 19, 2020, Wong recorded a freshman season-high 27 points and 12 rebounds, making all 14 of his free throws, in a 102–95 win over Virginia Tech in triple overtime. As a freshman, he averaged 7.7 points and three rebounds per game. 

On January 16, 2021, Wong posted a career-high 30 points, seven rebounds and six assists in a 78–72 victory against Louisville. As a sophomore, he averaged 17.1 points, 4.8 rebounds and 2.4 assists per game, earning third-team All-ACC honors. On April 14, 2021, Wong declared for the 2021 NBA draft while maintaining his college eligibility. He ultimately returned for his junior season. Wong was named to the third-team All-ACC as a junior. He was the second-leading scorer on the team, which advanced to the Elite Eight of the 2022 NCAA tournament. After the season, he again declared for the draft while maintaining his eligibility.

Career statistics

College

|-
| style="text-align:left;"| 2019–20
| style="text-align:left;"| Miami
| 31 || 13 || 21.2 || .416 || .373 || .829 || 3.0 || 1.0 || .5 || .4 || 7.7
|-
| style="text-align:left;"| 2020–21
| style="text-align:left;"| Miami
| 27 || 26 || 35.5 || .431 || .347 || .803 || 4.8 || 2.4 || 1.1 || .5 || 17.1
|-
| style="text-align:left;"| 2021–22
| style="text-align:left;"| Miami
| 37 || 36 || 33.9 || .452 || .302 || .748 || 4.3 || 2.0 || .9 || .3 || 15.3
|- class="sortbottom"
| style="text-align:center;" colspan="2"| Career
| 95 || 75 || 30.2 || .438 || .331 || .787 || 4.0 || 1.8 || .8 || .4 || 13.3

Personal life
Wong is the son of Terrence and LaChelle Wong. He has three brothers, named Brian, Terrence and Elijah. His paternal great-grandfather was Chinese.

References

External links
Miami Hurricanes bio

2001 births
Living people
All-American college men's basketball players
American men's basketball players
American sportspeople of Chinese descent
Basketball players from New Jersey
Miami Hurricanes men's basketball players
Notre Dame High School (New Jersey) alumni
People from Piscataway, New Jersey
People from South Brunswick, New Jersey
Sportspeople from Middlesex County, New Jersey
Point guards
Shooting guards